Phaeosaces compsotypa is a species of moth. It is endemic to New Zealand. The species has been known as Cryptolechia compsotypa until Phaeosaces was reinstated as a valid genus by John S. Dugdale in 1988.

References

Moths of New Zealand
Gelechioidea
Endemic fauna of New Zealand
Moths described in 1885
Taxa named by Edward Meyrick
Endemic moths of New Zealand